Ulrike Ottinger (born 6 June 1942) is a German filmmaker and photographer.

Early life
From 1959 she was a visiting student at the Academy of Arts in Munich and worked as a painter. Her mother, Maria Weinberg, was a journalist and her father, Ulrich Ottinger, was a painter.

From 1962 to 1968, Ottinger worked as a freelance artist in Paris and studied etching with Johnny Friedlaender among other studies. They participated in several exhibitions.

Film career
The films of Ottinger have been said to "reject or parody the conventions of art cinema and search for new ways to construct visual pleasure, creating various spectator positions usually neglected or marginalized by cinematic address". Her films include strong elements of stylization and fantasy, as well as ethnographic explorations.

In 1966 she wrote her first screenplay, entitled Die Mongolische Doppelschublade.

Ottinger returned to West Germany in 1969 and, in cooperation with the Film Seminar at the University of Konstanz, founded the film club "Visuell", which she directed until 1972. She also headed a gallery and the associated "galeriepress”, where they edited works by contemporary artists.

Ottinger developed her own bizarre surrealist film-style, which among other things, was marked by widespread abandonment of a linear plot and instead linger long in individual scenes, which in turn make überstarke and extravagant costumes of the imagination mostly female cast artfully to own collages were designed.

She directed and did stage design for Elfriede Jelinek's Clara S. at the Württembergisches Staatstheater in Stuttgart in 1983, and did the same for Jelinek's Begierde und Fahrerlaubnis in Graz in 1986. In 1989, her film Joan of Arc of Mongolia, with Delphine Seyrig who acted in many of her films, was entered into the 39th Berlin International Film Festival.

In 2003, Ottinger was selected for a solo exhibition at the Renaissance Society in Chicago. Titled South East Passage, the work "is in three chapters - a travelogue of the artist's journey from southeast Poland to the Bulgarian shores of the Black Sea and a portrait of two coastal cities, Odessa and Istanbul". South East Passage was the first of a two-part series of exhibits exploring Eastern European video work.

On the occasion of the 2009 New York premiere of The Korean Wedding Chest, with Ottinger to be in attendance, The New York Times characterized the director as, "[d]uring the 1980s heyday of the New German Cinema, having constituted a one-woman avant-garde opposition to the sulky male melodramas of Wenders, Fassbinder and Herzog, her films being long, discursive and wildly inventive."

Ottinger's films, with their preference for the Far Eastern formal language is visible, turned in the following decades, some unconventional documentaries about life in various Asian regions. Ottinger was to direct the horror-drama film Die Blutgräfin, based on the life of Elisabeth Bathory; however, the project has not been produced as of January 2015.

Other activities
Ottinger has also worked as a photographer, lithographer and painter. Since 2019, she has been a member of the Academy of Motion Picture Arts and Sciences.

Personal life
Ottinger has lived in Berlin since 1973. She has always been openly lesbian.

Filmography
1972: Laokoon & Söhne (Laocoön & Sons)
1973: Berlin-Fieber (Documentary film about the Happening Berlin-Fieber by Wolf Vostell)
1975:   (Die Betörung der blauen Matrosen)
1976: VOAEX (Documentary film about the making of Wolf Vostell sculpture VOAEX in Spain)
1978: Madame X – Eine absolute Herrscherin (Madame X: An Absolute Ruler)
1979: Ticket of No Return (Bildnis einer Trinkerin)
1981: Freak Orlando
1984:  (Dorian Gray im Spiegel der Boulevardpresse)
1986: China. Die Künste – der Alltag (China. The Arts – the People)
1986: Sieben Frauen – Sieben Todsünden (Seven Women, Seven Sins)
1989: Joan of Arc of Mongolia
1990: Countdown
1992: Taiga
1997: Exil Shanghai (Exile Shanghai)
2002: Südostpassage  (Southeast Passage)
2004: Zwölf Stühle  (Twelve Chairs)
2007: Prater
2009: Still Moving (short)
2009: The Korean Wedding Chest
2011: Under Snow
2016: Chamisso's Shadow: A Journey to the Bering Sea in Three Chapters
2020: Paris Calligrammes

Further reading

Primary literature
 Ulrike Ottinger. 'Ulrike Ottinger'. MNCARS, 2013. 
 Ulrike Ottinger. 'Floating Food'. Walther König, 2011. 
 Ulrike Ottinger. 'Image Archive'. Nürnberg: Verlag für moderne Kunst, 2006.

Secondary literature

 Laurence A. Rickels. 'Ulrike Ottinger: The Autobiography of Art Cinema'. University of Minnesota Press, 2008. 
 Tanja Nusser. 'Von und zu anderen Ufern. Ulrike Ottingers filmische Reiseerzählungen'. Köln: Böhlau, 2002.

See also
 List of female film and television directors
 List of lesbian filmmakers
 List of LGBT-related films directed by women

References

External links
Official site
Ulrike Ottinger. Faculty profile at European Graduate School (Biography, filmography, and videos)

 Ulrike Ottinger - Nomad from the Lake Die Nomaden Vom See at Women Make Movies

1942 births
Living people
German documentary filmmakers
German feminists
Film people from Baden-Württemberg
Lesbian photographers
LGBT film directors
Women documentary filmmakers
German lesbian artists
German LGBT photographers
People from Konstanz
Academy of Fine Arts, Munich alumni
Academic staff of European Graduate School
Members of the Academy of Arts, Berlin
Recipients of the Cross of the Order of Merit of the Federal Republic of Germany